The following is a list of bands from British Columbia.

By city

Abbotsford
Hedley
You Say Party

Burnaby
The Skulls

Chilliwack
The Darkest of the Hillside Thickets
Mystery Machine
Pardon My Striptease
These Kids Wear Crowns

Coquitlam
Clumsy Lovers
Matthew Good Band
Ten Ways

Cranbrook
Lillix

Delta
54-40
The Higgins
Theory of a Deadman

Kelowna
Bend Sinister
Cry of the Afflicted
Empyria
Ginger
The Grapes of Wrath
Ladyhawk
Secret and Whisper
Stutterfly
We Are the City
Yukon Blonde

Langley
Fake Shark - Real Zombie!
Gob

Maple Ridge
Stabilo

Mission
Faber Drive

New Westminster
The Devin Townsend Band

North Vancouver
D.b.s.
Spirit of the West
Soul Decision

Richmond
In Medias Res

Surrey
Good for Grapes

Vancouver
3 Inches of Blood
Archspire
Art of Dying
The Awkward Stage
Baptists
The Be Good Tanyas
Bear Mountain
The Belle Game
Big John Bates
Bison B.C.
The Black Halos
Black Mountain
Blasphemy
Blue Monday
The Blue Shadows
Bob's Your Uncle
Brand New Unit
The Brass Action
Brasstronaut
The Buttless Chaps
Calpurnia
Chilliwack
The Choir Practice
Conjure One
Copyright (Circle C)
Cub
Cyberaktif
Dear Rouge
Default
Delerium
Destroyer
D.O.A.
Doug and the Slugs
Download
The Dreadnoughts
Econoline Crush
The Evaporators
Forty Foot Echo
Front Line Assembly
Los Furios
Headpins
Hey Ocean!
Hinterland
Idle Eyes
Images in Vogue
Japandroids
The Jolts
Kill Matilda
The Kings
Ladyhawk
Lava Hay
Limblifter
LiveonRelease
Loverboy
Left Spine Down
The Manvils
Maow
Marianas Trench
Mecca Normal
Moev
Mother Mother
The New Pornographers
Nickelback
No Kids
Numb
Odds
ohGr
The Organ
Ox
P:ano
The Pack A.D.
The Paperboys
Payolas
Peach Pit
Pink Mountaintops
The Poppy Family
Pointed Sticks
The Powder Blues Band
Pride Tiger
Prism
Pure
Rascalz
The Real McKenzies
Rose Chronicles
Rymes with Orange
Said the Whale
The Salteens
Sandalspring
Skinny Puppy
Slow
Snowbeast
Social Deviantz
Soul Decision
Straight Lines
Strapping Young Lad
Strange Advance
The Subhumans
Sumac
Superconductor
Sweatshop Union
Sweeney Todd
Swollen Members
Synæsthesia
The Tear Garden
The Tourist Company
Trooper
The Veer Union
The Washboard Union
West End Girls
White Lung
Young and Sexy
Young Canadians
Young Saints
Zimmers Hole
The Zolas
Zolty Cracker
Zumpano

Victoria
Acres Of Lions
Armchair Cynics
Current Swell
Dayglo Abortions
Frog Eyes
The Hanson Brothers
Hot Hot Heat
Immaculate Machine
Jets Overhead
Jon and Roy
The Laundronauts
Mythos
Nomeansno
Shapes and Sizes
Showbusiness Giants
Spiritbox
Unleash the Archers
Zerbin

White Rock
Hawking

See also
Music of Vancouver
List of bands from Canada
List of Canadian musicians
List of musicians from British Columbia

References

British Columbia bands
 British Columbia
British Columbia-related lists
British Columbia